The Women's double sculls event at the 2010 South American Games was held over March 22 at 9:00.

Medalists

Records

Results

References
Final

Double Scull W